Colaconema elegans is a species of marine red algae. It is found in Korea, California and Brazil. It is parasitic in the stipe of Eisenia arborea.

References

External links

 Colaconema elegans at AlgaeBase

Florideophyceae
Plants described in 2011